Adalu Badalu is a 1979 Indian Kannada-language film, directed by C. V. Rajendran and produced by P. Krishnaraj. The film stars Srinath, Aarathi, M. P. Shankar and Dwarakish. The film has musical score by Vijaya Bhaskar.

Cast

Srinath
Aarathi
M. P. Shankar
Dwarakish
Manjula in Special Appearance
Lokesh in Special Appearance
Halam
Lokanath
Baby Rekha

Soundtrack

References

External links
 

1970s Kannada-language films
Films scored by Vijaya Bhaskar
Films directed by C. V. Rajendran